The 23rd Legislative Assembly of Saskatchewan was elected in the 1995 Saskatchewan election. It was controlled by the New Democratic Party under Premier Roy Romanow.

The Liberal Party began this Legislative Assembly as the Official Opposition led by Lynda Haverstock.  However, when the Saskatchewan Party was formed in 1997, it became the Official Opposition led by Ken Krawetz.

In the spring of 1999 Jack Goohsen was forced to resign as Cypress Hills MLA due to a criminal conviction on corruption charges. He was succeeded by Wayne Elhard of the Saskatchewan Party for the remaining year of the 23rd Assembly.

Members elected

1995–1997
Names in bold represent party leaders and the Speaker.

1997–1999
Names in bold represent party leaders and the Speaker.

References
 The list from the official website

Terms of the Saskatchewan Legislature